BJSM may refer to:

British Journal of Sexual Medicine
British Journal of Sports Medicine
 British Joint Staff Mission